Vasilije Veljko Milovanović (born 30 December 1998) is a Serbian football midfielder. He is the son of Neško Milovanović.

Club career

Radnički Kragujevac
Born in Kragujevac, Milovanović was promoted in the first team of Radnički 1923 He made his professional debut for in 29 fixture match of the 2014–15 Serbian SuperLiga season, replacing Jovan Lukić in the 86th minute of the Jagodina, played on 16 May 2015. He appeared in the final fixture of the season against Vojvodina, joining the game from the bench too. He started new season with the first team, but also stayed with youth for the next two seasons. On 5 October 2016, Milovanović scored a twice in a Kragujevac City Cup match against Sloga Lužnica. After he overgrown youth selection, Milovanović also started the 2017–18 Serbian First League campaign with the first squad. Later, in last days of the summer transfer window 2017, he moved on a one-year loan to Serbian League West side Smederevo as a bonus player.

Career statistics

References

External links
 Vasilije Veljko Milovanović stats at utakmica.rs 
 
 

1998 births
Living people
Sportspeople from Kragujevac
Association football midfielders
Serbian footballers
FK Radnički 1923 players
FK Smederevo players
Serbian SuperLiga players